Owen Donohoe (pronounced ; born February 13, 1945) is a Republican member of the Kansas House of Representatives, representing the 39th district.  He served three terms in the Kansas Legislature, from 2006 to 2012, before being elected the same seat again in 2018. Re-elected in 2020, Donohoe is currently in his fifth term.

Donohoe moved to Kansas in 1989 to start his own medical device company, Donohoe and Associates. He has been married for 42 years and has five children and 16 grandchildren.

Issue positions
Donohoe describes himself as a "fiscal conservative, for limited government, a strong proponent of individual property rights, and 'pro-life'".

Committee membership
 Economic Development and Tourism (Vice-Chair)
 Appropriations Committee
 General Government Budget
 Taxation Committee
 Education Committee
 Economic Development and Tourism Committee (Vice-Chair)
 Aging and Long Term Care
 Joint Economic Committee

References

External links
 Official Website
 Kansas Legislature - Owen Donohoe
 Project Vote Smart profile
 Kansas Votes profile
 State Surge - Legislative and voting track record
 Follow the Money campaign contributions:
 2006, 2008

Republican Party members of the Kansas House of Representatives
Living people
21st-century American politicians
1945 births